El Chicó is an affluent neighbourhood (barrio) in the locality of Chapinero in Bogotá, Colombia.

Limits 
 North: Calle 100
 East: Eastern Hills
 West: Autopista Norte
 South: Calle 88

Etymology 
The name chicó is derived from the Chibcha word chicú which means "our ally".

Tourism 
El Chicó is home to the Parque de la 93, a park and restaurant area. It also hosts Museo el Chicó.

References 

Neighbourhoods of Bogotá
Muisca Confederation
Chicu